Georgia State Route 3W may refer to:

 Georgia State Route 3W (Albany 1946–1957): A former state highway that traveled in Albany
 Georgia State Route 3W (Albany 1960–1973): A former state highway that traveled in Albany
 Georgia State Route 3W (Atlanta–Marietta 1937–1946): A former state highway that traveled in Atlanta and Marietta
 Georgia State Route 3W (Atlanta–Marietta 1954–1955): A former state highway that traveled in Atlanta and Marietta
 Georgia State Route 3W (Thomaston): A former state highway that traveled in Thomaston

0003W